Erkki Antero Liikanen (born 19 September 1950) is a Finnish social democratic politician and a former Governor of the Bank of Finland.

Early life and education
Erkki Antero Liikanen obtained a bachelor’s degree in Political Science (Economics) from the University of Helsinki in 1975.

Political career
Liikanen was elected to the Finnish Parliament in 1972 when he was only 21 years old. Liikanen was appointed as the Minister of Finance in the Holkeri Cabinet in 1987. He left Parliament in 1990 to become the first Finnish Ambassador to the European Union.

In 1994 he became the first Finnish Member of the European Commission. He was Commissioner for Budget, Personnel and administration, which included responsibilities for translation and information technology.

Liikanen served as Governor of the Bank of Finland from 12 July 2004. As such he also became a Member of the Governing Council of the European Central Bank (2004–2018) and Governor of the International Monetary Fund for Finland (2004–2018).

In February 2012, EU Commissioner Michel Barnier asked Liikanen to chair a group of experts to assess the need for structural reforms to the EU banking sector. Their works is known as the Liikanen report was published on 2 October 2012.

Liikanen was also the chairman of Finnish Red Cross between June 2008 and June 2014.

In early 2019, a Reuters poll of economists found that while Benoît Cœuré was considered best-suited for the role as President of the European Central Bank, the most likely compromise candidate was Liikanen.

Positions held 
 Chairman of the Board of the Bank of Finland, 12 July 2004– (Present position)
 1995–2004 Member of the European Commission, Brussels
 1990–1994 Ambassador Extraordinary and Plenipotentiary, Head of Finnish Mission to the European Union, Brussels
 1987–1990 Minister of Finance
 1983–1987 Parliamentary Trustee to the Bank of Finland (Vice-Chairman), Speaker's Council
 1981–1987 Secretary-General of the Social Democratic Party
 1980–1989 Member and subsequently Chairman of the Supervisory Board of the Outokumpu (steel)
 1978, 1982, 1988 Elected as Member of the Electoral College to select the Finnish President
 1972–1990 Member of Parliament; member of Cultural Affairs Committee (1972–1975), Agriculture and Forestry Committee (Vice-Chairman) (1977–1979), Foreign Affairs Committee (member 1975–1982; Chairman 1983–1987)

Other activities

International organizations 
 European Central Bank (ECB), Member of the Ethics Committee (since 2018)
 International Monetary Fund (IMF), Ex-Officio Member of the Board of Governors

Non-profit organizations 
 Bruegel, Chair of the Board (since 2020)
 Bilderberg Group, Member of the Steering Committee
 Systemic Risk Council (SRC), Member of the  Advisory Board
 Trilateral Commission, Member of the European Group

Personal life
Liikanen is married to Hanna-Liisa Liikanen and they have two daughters.

Literary work 
 Brysselin päiväkirjat 1990–1994 (edited by Eila Nevalainen)

References

External links 

 Homepage of Erkki Liikanen
 Curriculum Vitae of Erkki Liikanen

|-

|-

|-

|-

|-

1950 births
Finnish European Commissioners
Governors of the Bank of Finland
Living people
Members of the Parliament of Finland (1972–75)
Members of the Parliament of Finland (1975–79)
Members of the Parliament of Finland (1979–83)
Members of the Parliament of Finland (1983–87)
Members of the Parliament of Finland (1987–91)
Ministers of Finance of Finland
People from Mikkeli
Permanent Representatives of Finland to the European Union
Social Democratic Party of Finland politicians
University of Helsinki alumni
Bruegel (think tank) people